The Sixpenny Office was one of the British admiralty's smaller offices. Established in 1696, it was originally based at  Tower Hill, London. The office's main responsibility was the collection of six pence from all serving seaman's wage's on a monthly basis that was used to fund Greenwich Hospital's provision of care for sick and aged seaman. .

The office was administered by navy board Commissioners for Managing the Sixpenny Duty for the Support of Greenwich Hospital until 1832 when it, along with the Navy Board, was abolished and its functions were dispersed between the members of the Board of Admiralty.

History
The Sixpenny Office was originally established in 1692 during the reign of William and Mary of England. It was one of the admiralty's smaller offices and was responsible for collecting six pence from every serving seaman's wage on a monthly basis. The money was collected by duty receivers who were appointed to various ports around the country. The proceeds were then used to  fund the Greenwich Hospital Department, which provided care for sick and aged seaman. The office and processing of the funds received was administered by Navy Board commissioners. When the Navy Board was abolished in 1832 its former function of collecting duty towards securing a seaman's pension transferred to the Board of Admiralty.

Head of office
Commissioners for Managing the Sixpenny Duty for the Support of Greenwich Hospital and Supporting Staff, Office at Tower-Hill. Incomplete list of post holders included:

First Commissioner and Receiver
 1814-1826, Benjamin Stowe
 1827-1832, Chas Kinsey

Second Commissioner and Comptroller
 1788-1820, John Beverley Esq
 1820-1826 , Chas Kinsey
 1827-1832 G. B. Hamilton

Supporting staff

Accountant
 1788, John Cleveland

First Clerk
 1820-1832, Charles Stanbridge

Receiver
 1788-1803 Thomas Hicks
 1803-1810, John Rashleigh

Citations

Sources
 Beaston, Robert (1788). A Political Index to the Histories of Great Britain and Ireland: Or, A Complete Register of the Hereditary Honours, Public Offices, and Persons in Office, from the Earliest Periods to the Present Time. London, Great Britain: G. G. J. & J. Robinson. 
 Hamilton, C. I. (February 2011). The Making of the Modern Admiralty: British Naval Policy-Making, 1805–1927. Cambridge, England: Cambridge University Press. .
 Office, Admiralty (December 1814). The Navy List. London, England: John Murray. 
 Office, Admiralty (January 1820). The Navy List. London, England: John Murray.
 Office, Admiralty (December 1827). The Navy List. London, England: W. Clowes.
 The Parliamentary Debates from the Year 1803 to the Present Time. London, England: Hansard. 1812.

Admiralty departments